The spotted dwarf gecko (Hemiphyllodactylus bintik) is a species of gecko. It is endemic to Peninsular Malaysia.

References

Hemiphyllodactylus
Reptiles described in 2015
Endemic fauna of Malaysia
Reptiles of Malaysia